Alexander Stanislavovich Zarutsky (born 24 January 1969) is a Russian professional association football official and a former player.

Honours
Kazakhstan Premier League champion: 2000.

External links

1969 births
Sportspeople from Nalchik
Living people
Russian footballers
Association football defenders
Russian Premier League players
Ukrainian Premier League players
Russian expatriate footballers
Expatriate footballers in Ukraine
Expatriate footballers in Kazakhstan
PFC Spartak Nalchik players
FC Spartak Vladikavkaz players
SC Tavriya Simferopol players
FC Zhenis Astana players